Arnaldo Dias Baptista (born July 6, 1948) is a Brazilian rock musician and composer.

Biography
Born to pianist, Clarisse Leite, and poet, César Dias Baptista, Baptista studied classical piano from 1955 to 1959, double bass from 1962 to 1963, and acoustic guitar from 1963 to 1965. In 1966 he formed the influential Os Mutantes band with his brother Sérgio Dias and Rita Lee, where he played bass guitar, keyboards and sang. Baptista left the band in 1973 due to disagreements with the other members of the band and the excessive use of LSD, of which he had been hospitalized for. In 1974 he tried to work as a musical producer, with no success. This motivated him to try a solo career, and in the same year, he released the album Lóki?, which is considered his best work by some critics.

Baptista recorded two albums with the band Patrulha do Espaço between 1977 and 1978, and later resumed his solo career. In 2006, Os Mutantes reunited without Rita Lee, and Baptista played with his brother Sérgio and drummer Dinho Leme 33 years after originally leaving the band. In 2007 Baptista left the band again to pursue personal projects.

Baptista currently lives with his wife, Lucinha Barbosa, in the city of Juiz de Fora, where he spends most of his time painting, singing and writing songs. He is a vegetarian.

Discography
With Os Mutantes
 1968: Os Mutantes
 1969: Mutantes
 1970: A Divina Comédia ou Ando Meio Desligado
 1971: Jardim Elétrico
 1972: Mutantes e Seus Cometas no País do Baurets
 1992: O A e o Z (recorded in 1973)
 2000: Tecnicolor (recorded in 1970)
 2006: Mutantes Ao Vivo - Barbican Theatre, Londres 2006

Solo
 1974: Lóki?
 1982: Singin' Alone
 1987: Disco Voador
 2004: Let It Bed
 2013: Shining Alone – Ao Vivo 1981 (recorded in 1981; digital distribution only)
 TBA: Esphera

With Patrulha do Espaço
 1988: Elo Perdido (recorded in 1977)
 1988: Faremos uma Noitada Excelente (recorded in 1978)
 2013: Elo Mais Que Perdido (recorded in 1977; digital distribution only)

Tribute Albums
 1989: Sanguinho Novo... Arnaldo Baptista Revisitado
 1995: Onde É Que Está o Meu Rock and Roll?

See also
 Os Mutantes
 Tropicália

References

External links
 Arnaldo Baptista's Official Site

1948 births
Living people
Brazilian rock singers
Musicians from São Paulo
Brazilian keyboardists
Brazilian pianists
Brazilian bass guitarists
Male bass guitarists
Psychedelic rock musicians
Progressive rock pianists
Brazilian experimental musicians
Tropicalia singers
Male pianists
21st-century pianists
21st-century Brazilian male singers
21st-century Brazilian singers
Os Mutantes members